Denmark competed at the 1964 Summer Olympics in Tokyo, Japan. 60 competitors, 53 men and 7 women, took part in 40 events in 10 sports.

Medalists

Gold
 Ole Berntsen, Christian von Bülow and Ole Poulsen — Sailing, Men's Dragon Class
 John Hansen, Bjørn Hasløv, Erik Petersen and Kurt Helmudt — Rowing, Men's Coxless Fours

Silver
 Kjell Rodian — Cycling, Men's Individual Road Race

Bronze
 Henning Wind — Sailing, Men's Finn Class
 Preben Isaksson — Cycling, Men's 4.000m Individual Pursuit
 Peer Nielsen and John Sørensen — Canoeing, Men's C-2 1.000m

Athletics

Boxing

Canoeing

Cycling

Twelve cyclists represented Denmark in 1964.

Individual road race
 Kjell Rodian
 Ole Højlund Pedersen
 Flemming Gleerup Hansen
 Ole Ritter

Team time trial
 Flemming Gleerup Hansen
 Henning Petersen
 Ole Højlund Pedersen
 Ole Ritter

Sprint
 Niels Fredborg
 Peder Pedersen

1000m time trial
 Jan Ingstrup-Mikkelsen

Tandem
 Niels Fredborg
 Per Sarto Jørgensen

Individual pursuit
 Preben Isaksson

Team pursuit
 Bent Hansen
 Preben Isaksson
 Jan Ingstrup-Mikkelsen
 Kurt vid Stein

Diving

Rowing

Sailing

Open

Shooting

Two shooters represented Denmark in 1964.

50 m rifle, three positions
 Niels Petersen
 Ole Hviid Jensen

50 m rifle, prone
 Ole Hviid Jensen
 Niels Petersen

Swimming

Wrestling

References

External links
Official Olympic Reports
International Olympic Committee results database

Nations at the 1964 Summer Olympics
1964
Summer Olympics